The 2028 United States Senate elections will be held on November 7, 2028, with 34 of the 100 seats in the Senate being contested in regular elections, the winners of which will serve six-year terms in the United States Congress from January 3, 2029, to January 3, 2035. Senators are divided into three groups or classes whose terms are staggered so that a different class is elected every two years. Class 3 senators were last elected in 2022, and will be up for election again in 2034. These elections will run concurrent with the 2028 United States presidential election.

As of November 2022, one Republican senator, Tim Scott of South Carolina, has already announced plans for retirement; no Republican senators have announced plans to run for re-election; and no Democratic senators either have announced plans for retirement nor are running for re-election.

Partisan composition 
All 34 Class 3 Senate seats are up for election in 2028; Class 3 currently consists of 19 Republicans and 15 Democrats.

Change in composition 
Each block represents one of the one hundred seats in the U.S. Senate.  "D#" is a Democratic senator and "R#" is a Republican senator.  They are arranged so that the parties are separated and a majority is clear by crossing the middle.

Before the elections 
Each block indicates an incumbent senator's actions going into the election.

After the elections

Retirements 
As of November 2022, one Republican has announced plans to retire.

Race summary

Elections leading to the next Congress 
In these general elections, the winners will be elected for the term beginning January 3, 2029.

Alabama

One-term Republican Katie Britt was elected in 2022 with 66.8% of the vote.

Alaska

Four-term Republican Lisa Murkowski was re-elected in 2022 with 53.7% of the vote. She has filed paperwork to run for re-election.

Arizona

One-term Democrat Mark Kelly was elected to a full term in 2022 with 51.4% of the vote, first being elected in a special election in 2020 to complete the remainder of Republican John McCain's term. He has filed paperwork to run for re-election.

Arkansas

Three-term Republican John Boozman was re-elected in 2022 with 65.7% of the vote. He has filed paperwork to run for re-election.

California

One-term Democrat Alex Padilla was elected to a first full term in 2022 with 61.1% of the vote, having first been appointed in 2021 to complete the remainder of Democrat Kamala Harris' term.

Colorado

Three-term Democrat Michael Bennet was re-elected in 2022 with 55.9% of the vote. He has filed paperwork to run for re-election.

Connecticut

Three-term Democrat Richard Blumenthal was re-elected in 2022 with 57.5% of the vote. He has filed paperwork to run for re-election.

Florida

Three-term Republican Marco Rubio was re-elected in 2022 with 57.7% of the vote.

Georgia

One-term Democrat Raphael Warnock was elected to a full term in 2022 with 51.4% of the vote, having first been elected in a special election in 2021 to complete the remainder of Republican Johnny Isakson's term. He has filed paperwork to run for re-election.

Hawaii

Two-term Democrat Brian Schatz was re-elected in 2022 with 71.2% of the vote.

Idaho

Five-term Republican Mike Crapo was re-elected in 2022 with 60.7% of the vote.

Illinois

Two-term Democrat Tammy Duckworth was re-elected in 2022 with 56.8% of the vote. She has filed paperwork to run for re-election.

Indiana

Two-term Republican Todd Young was re-elected in 2022 with 58.6% of the vote.

Iowa

Eight-term Republican Chuck Grassley was re-elected in 2022 with 56.1% of the vote. He has filed paperwork to run for re-election.

Kansas

Three-term Republican Jerry Moran was re-elected in 2022 with 60.0% of the vote.

Kentucky

Three-term Republican Rand Paul was re-elected in 2022 with 61.8% of the vote.

Louisiana

Two-term Republican John Kennedy was re-elected in 2022 with 61.6% of the vote in the first round of the "Louisiana primary".

Maryland

Two-term Democrat Chris Van Hollen was re-elected in 2022 with 65.8% of the vote. He has filed paperwork to run for re-election.

Missouri

One-term Republican Eric Schmitt was elected in 2022 with 55.4% of the vote.

Nevada

Two-term Democrat Catherine Cortez Masto was re-elected in 2022 with 48.8% of the vote. She has filed paperwork to run for re-election.

New Hampshire

Two-term Democrat Maggie Hassan was re-elected in 2022 with 53.5% of the vote. She has filed paperwork to run for re-election.

New York

Five-term Democrat  Charles Schumer was re-elected in 2022 with 56.8% of the vote. He has filed paperwork to run for re-election.

North Carolina

One-term Republican Ted Budd was elected in 2022 with 50.5% of the vote.

North Dakota

Three-term Republican John Hoeven was re-elected in 2022 with 56.5% of the vote. He has filed paperwork to run for re-election.

Ohio

One-term Republican J. D. Vance was elected in 2022 with 53% of the vote. He has filed paperwork to run for re-election.

Oklahoma

Two-term Republican James Lankford was re-elected in 2022 with 64.3% of the vote.

Oregon

Five-term Democrat Ron Wyden was re-elected in 2022 with 55.9% of the vote. He has filed paperwork to run for re-election.

Pennsylvania

One-term Democrat John Fetterman was elected in 2022 with 51.2% of the vote. He has filed paperwork to run for re-election.

South Carolina

Two-term Republican Tim Scott was re-elected in 2022 with 62.9% of the vote. He is retiring and will not run for a third term.

South Dakota

Four-term Republican John Thune was re-elected in 2022 with 69.6% of the vote. He has filed paperwork to run for re-election.

Utah

Three-term Republican Mike Lee was re-elected in 2022 with 53.2% of the vote. He has filed paperwork to run for re-election.

Vermont

One-term Democrat Peter Welch was elected in 2022 with 67.3% of the vote.

Washington

Six-term Democrat Patty Murray was re-elected in 2022 with 57.1% of the vote. She has filed paperwork to run for re-election.

Wisconsin

Three-term Republican Ron Johnson was re-elected in 2022 with 50.4% of the vote.

See also 
 2028 United States elections

Notes

References